The Lifestyle is a 1999 American documentary about swinging in the United States.

See also
American Swing
Swingtown
Plato's Retreat
Open marriage

References

External links

American documentary films
1999 films
Group sex
Free sex
Sexual fidelity
Swinging (sexual practice)
Casual sex
Sexuality and gender identity-based cultures
Documentary films about sexuality
1999 documentary films
1990s English-language films
1990s American films